Thomas Mathiesen (5 October 1933 – 29 May 2021) was a Norwegian sociologist.

Background 
Mathiesen grew up in the Norwegian county of Akershus, as the only child of Einar Mathiesen (1903–1983) and Birgit Mathiesen (1908–1990). He is the grandson of surgeon Johan Berger Mathiesen (1872–1923).

Career 
Mathiesen studied sociology at the University of Wisconsin (B.A. 1955). He then returned to Norway, and graduated as M.A. in 1958 (major subject: sociology, minor subject: psychology and social anthropology) from the University of Oslo, where he did his doctorate in 1965. In 1972 he was appointed Professor of sociology of law at the Faculty of Law, University of Oslo, (emeritus 2004).

He was a visiting professor at the University of California in Santa Barbara (1967) and Berkeley (1975), the University of Tromsø (1980), also the University of Warsaw (1988) and the  University of Bremen (1988).

Together with Nils Christie and Louk Hulsman he was a distinguished representative of the prison abolition movement. He wrote in Norwegian and English, several of his books have been translated into other languages, including Swedish, Danish, German, Italian and Spanish. Some of Mathiesen's books in English include The Politics of Abolition (1974), Silently Silenced (2004) and Towards a Surveillant Society (2013). His 1965 work The Defences of the Weak was selected for the Norwegian Sociology Canon by the Norwegian newspaper Morgenbladet in 2011.

In The Viewer Society: Michel Foucault's 'Panopticon' revisited (1997), Mathiesen presented the concept of the Synopticon or "surveillance of the few by the many", as the sociological reciprocal of Panopticism, which Foucault described in Discipline and Punish. 

Mathiesen was one of the inspirers of the British prisoners movement, Preservation of the Rights of Prisoners (PROP) and even spoke at their foundation meeting. He also presented a paper at the eleventh symposium of the National Deviancy Conference in September 1972 entitled 'Strategies of Resistance within a Total Institution.'

Mathiesen's autobiography, entitled Cadenza: A Professional Autobiography, was published by the British publisher European Group Press in fall 2017.

Publications and articles (selections)
Mathiesen, T. (1965) The Defences of the Weak: A Sociological Study of a Norwegian Correctional Institution, London: Tavistock
Mathiesen, T. (1972) Beyond the Boundaries of Organisations, California: Glendessary Press
Mathiesen, T. (1974) The Politics of Abolition, London: Martin Robertson
Mathiesen, T. (1983) "The future of control systems - the case of Norway" In: Garland, D. & Young, P. (eds) The Power to Punish, London: Heinemann
Mathiesen, T. (1986) "The Politics of abolition", Contemporary Crises 10: 81–94
Mathiesen, T. (2004) Silently Silenced, U.K.: Waterside Press
Mathiesen, T. (2010) Prisons on Trial: A Critical Assessment. London: Sage.
Mathiesen, T. (2013) Towards a Surveillant Society, U.K.: Waterside Press
Mathiesen, T. et al. (2015) The Politics of Abolition Revisited, U.K.: Routledge
Mathiesen, T. (2017) Cadenza: A Professional Autobiography'', U.K.: European Group Press

References

External links
Thomas Mathiesen's staff page

1933 births
2021 deaths
Norwegian sociologists
Norwegian expatriates in the United States
Academic staff of the Faculty of Law, University of Oslo
University of Wisconsin–Madison College of Letters and Science alumni
Prison abolitionists
People from Akershus